Maik Langendorf (born 11 March 1972) is a former German-based Austrian professional darts player. He won a PDC tour card on the second day of the 2017 PDC Darts Qualifying School.

He has also represented Austria in the PDC World Cup of Darts in 2010 and 2013, both times with Mensur Suljović.

Langendorf qualified for the 2018 World Series of Darts Finals on 19 October 2018, where he lost 6-5 against Damon Heta.

References

External links

1972 births
Living people
German darts players
PDC World Cup of Darts Austrian team
Professional Darts Corporation former tour card holders
Sportspeople from Hamburg